Karl-Erik Alberts (1910–1989) was a Swedish cinematographer. He was employed on more than fifty film productions during his career. He worked for a variety of companies including Svensk Filmindustri, Europa Film and Svensk Talfilm.

Selected filmography

 The Marriage Game (1935)
 Mot nya tider (1939)
 Home from Babylon (1941)
 Doctor Glas (1942)
 Tomorrow's Melody (1942)
 Young Blood (1943)
 The Brothers' Woman (1943)
 Som du vill ha mej (1943)
 She Thought It Was Him (1943)
 Eaglets (1944)
 The Forest Is Our Heritage (1944)
 Count Only the Happy Moments (1944)
 Appassionata (1944)
 The Serious Game (1945)
 Maria of Kvarngarden (1945)
 Black Roses (1945)
 Onsdagsväninnan (1946)
 Two Women (1947)
 The Bride Came Through the Ceiling (1947)
 Loffe the Tramp (1948)
 Sunshine (1948)
 Number 17 (1949)
 Sven Tusan (1949)
 Pimpernel Svensson (1950)
Living on 'Hope' (1951)
 Getting Married (1955)
 The Summer Wind Blows (1955)
 A Doll's House (1956)
 Miss April (1958)
 Line Six (1958)
 Sängkammartjuven (1959)

References

Bibliography
 Rasmussen, Bjørn. Filmens hvem-vad-hvor: Udenlanske film 1950-1967. Politiken, 1968.

External links

1910 births
1989 deaths
Swedish cinematographers
People from Gothenburg
20th-century Swedish people